The 2019 Women's EuroHockey Junior Championship was the 19th edition of the Women's EuroHockey Junior Championship. It was held alongside the men's tournament in Valencia, Spain between 13 and 21 July 2019.

This tournament served as the European qualifier for the 2021 Junior World Cup, with the top six teams qualifying.

Participating nations
Alongside the host nation, 8 teams competed in the tournament.

Results

Preliminary round

Pool A

Pool B

Fifth to ninth place classification

Cross-over

Seventh and eighth place

Fifth and sixth place

First to fourth place classification

Semi-finals

Third and fourth place

Final

Statistics

Final standings

 Qualified for the 2021 Junior World Cup

 Relegated to the EuroHockey Junior Championship II

Goalscorers

See also
 2019 Men's EuroHockey Junior Championship
 2019 Women's EuroHockey Nations Championship

References

Women's EuroHockey Junior Championship
Junior
EuroHockey Junior Championship 
EuroHockey Junior Championship
International women's field hockey competitions hosted by Spain 
EuroHockey Junior Championship
Sports competitions in Valencia
21st century in Valencia
EuroHockey Championship
EuroHockey Junior Championship